Blacks in Law Enforcement of America is an African-American police organization, formed in the 1960s.

It speaks on behalf of black members of the community 
as well as black police officers, 
and also advocates against racial discrimination within police forces.

In 2016 Blacks in Law Enforcement of America opposed the Fraternal Order of Police for its endorsement of Donald Trump for president, saying it did not reflect the will of the membership and calling on groups of black police officers to oppose Trump.

The organization has praised police departments which built good community ties, including  Urbana and Champaign, IL, and Cincinnati, OH.

References

External links
 Official website

African-American law enforcement organizations
Post–civil rights era in African-American history
Anti-racism in the United States
Ethnic fraternal orders in the United States